The energy sector in Switzerland is, by its structure and importance, typical of a developed country. Apart from hydroelectric power and firewood, the country has few indigenous energy resources: oil products, natural gas and nuclear fuel are imported, so that in 2013 only 22.6% of primary energy consumption were covered by local resources.

Final energy consumption in Switzerland has increased more than fivefold since the beginning of the 20th century, from around 170,000 to 896,000 terajoules per year, with the largest share now being captured by transport (35% in 2013). This increase was made in parallel with the strong development of its economy and the increase in population. As the sector is highly liberalised, the federal energy policy aims to accompany the promises made in Kyoto by promoting a more rational use of energy and, particularly since the 1990s, the development of new renewable sources.

Thanks to the high share of hydroelectricity (59.6%) and nuclear power (31.7%) in electricity production, Switzerland's per capita energy-related  emissions are 28% lower than the European Union average and roughly equal to those of France.

Following the earthquake that struck Japan in March 2011 and the Fukushima nuclear accident, the Federal Council announced on 25 May 2011 a phase-out of nuclear energy scheduled for 2034.

In September 2016, both chambers of the Swiss Parliament voted for the Energiestrategie 2050, a set of measures to replace electrical energy produced by atomic reactors with renewable energy, reduce the use of fossil fuel and increase the efficiency of energy consumption. This decision was challenged by a national Referendum. In May 2017, the Swiss people voted against the Referendum, thereby confirming the decision taken by the parliament.

History
The energy economy in Switzerland developed similarly to the rest of Europe, but with some delay until 1850. There are three different periods. An agrarian society until the mid-nineteenth century, Switzerland's small scale energy economy was based on wood and biomass (plants feeding the animal and human labour), which was in general renewable energy. Also used were wind power and hydraulic power, and, from the eighteenth century, indigenous coal.

The industrial society, from 1860 to 1950, had to import coal as it was the main source of energy but not readily available as a natural resource. Another important source of energy was water power at low or high pressure. The current consumer society, developed using mostly oil, natural gas, water power (turbines) to a lesser extent, and later nuclear energy. The oil crisis and pollution of the environment prompted the increased use of renewable energy. It is notable that 100% of the Swiss railway network is electrified. The high proportion of energy generated through hydroelectric power and the lack of natural resources (such as coal and oil) help to explain why such a situation is strategically beneficial in Switzerland.

Energy strategy 2050 

On 21 May 2017, Swiss voters accepted the new Energy Act establishing the 'energy strategy 2050'. The aims of the energy strategy 2050 are:
 to reduce energy consumption,
 to increase energy efficiency and
 to promote renewable energies (such as water, solar, wind and geothermal power as well as biomass fuels).

The Energy Act of 2006 forbids the construction of new nuclear power plants in Switzerland.

Overview

Renewable energy in Switzerland
The Swiss government has set a target to cut fossil fuel use 20% by the year 2020. Most of the energy produced within Switzerland is renewable from hydropower and biomass. However this only accounts for around 15% of total overall energy consumption as the other 85% of energy  used is imported, mostly derived from fossil fuels.

Hydro

Based on the estimated mean production level, hydropower still accounted for almost 90% of domestic electricity production at the beginning of the 1970s, but this figure fell to around 60% by 1985 following the commissioning of Switzerland's nuclear power plants, and is now around 56%. Hydropower therefore remains Switzerland's most important domestic source of renewable energy.
Hydro energy was meaning to be taken down in 2013 with new laws on energy to be put in place but they were scrapped for a more eco friendly plan.

Hydroelectric companies received support from the state (for instance in the 2010s). Critics pointed out the lack of independence of the political institutions (cantonal and federal), of which several elected members are connected with the hydroelectric industry.

Wind
There has been a proposal to produce around 600 GWh (< 0.2%) of electricity per annum using wind turbines by 2030. Switzerland's wind power potential is several TWh per year.

Solar

Solar energy in Switzerland currently only accounts for 0.04% of total energy production. Currently the cost of solar energy is significantly higher than competing sources in Switzerland such as hydro. As costs of solar come down it is likely to become more market competitive. It is currently subsidised in an attempt to make it more competitive and attractive.

2019 Switzerland announced plans of large scale solar auctions.

Electricity 

Switzerland's per capita electricity consumption is slightly higher than that of its neighbours.

Production of electricity (2008):
 Hydropower plants, 56%
 Nuclear power plants, 39%
 Thermal power and other power plants, 5%

The Swiss Federal Office of Energy (SFOE) is within the Federal Department of Environment, Transport, Energy and Communications (DETEC). SwissEnergy is a program aiming at promoting energy efficiency and the use of renewable energy with the collaboration of the cantons and municipalities, and partners from trade and industry, environmental and consumer organisations.

A report was published in 2011 by the World Energy Council in association with Oliver Wyman, entitled Policies for the future: 2011 Assessment of country energy and climate policies, which ranks country performance according to an energy sustainability index. The best performers were Switzerland, Sweden and France.

Carbon dioxide emissions 

A study published in 2009 showed that the emissions of carbon dioxide due to the electricity consumed in Switzerland (total: 5.7 million tonnes) were seven times higher than the emissions of carbon dioxide due to the electricity produced in Switzerland (total: 0.8 million tonnes).

The study also showed that the production in Switzerland (64.6 TWh) was similar to the amount of electricity consumed in the country (63.7 TWh).
 

See also
 Nuclear power in Switzerland
 2000-watt society
 Federal Department of Environment, Transport, Energy and Communications

Notes and references

External links

 Swiss Federal Office of Energy